Box of Dub is a 2007 compilation album released by Soul Jazz Records in 2007. It features music of the contemporary dubstep music scene of the period. The album contains exclusive tracks by each artist.

Release
Box of Dub was released on compact disc and three-disc vinyl by Soul Jazz Records on May 28, 2007.
The album was followed up with Box of Dub 2: Dubstep and Future Dub.

Reception

From contemporary reviews, Matt Earp of XLR8R  as containing "half of a dozen of the scenes most successful producers" as well as having "great tracks from a few sideline observers." Earp noted that the tracks by Kode9 and Digital Mystikz were introspective while Burial's track "pulls off brilliant-sounding liquid D&B at dubstep tempo." Earp concluded that the biggest surprise was the tracks that came from outsiders such as Jay Haze and Michal Ho as well as Kevin Martin. Chris Mann of Resident Advisor stated that Box of Dub worked well as an introduction to dubstep, while finding that "the emphasis is on the dub roots of the scene rather than trying to cover all the possible ground. For this reason Digital Mystikz, Haze, Scuba and Skream appear with two tracks, while some of the pioneers and innovators such as Horsepower Productions, Benga and Shackleton are conspicuous by their absence." Killian Fox of The Observer called the album a "superb dubstep selection" declaring it an "essential record for initiates and devotees alike." finding the highlights to be Burial, Kode 9, and Skream. Spin gave the album a three and a half star rating out of five, stating that "dubstep hasn't caught on [in the United States]" while noting that tracks by "Burial, Kode 9 or the almighty Skream through fat speakers at high volume, and they'll melt your sacrum like bikram yoga."

Commenting on the release in 2010, Robin Murray of Clash stated the album "really supplied an expert primer to the youthful bass scene."

Track listing
Track listing adapted from the liner notes.

References

2007 compilation albums
Soul Jazz Records compilation albums
Dubstep compilation albums